Obsessed is the second studio album by American country music duo Dan + Shay, released by Warner Bros. Nashville on June 3, 2016. The lead single, "From the Ground Up", was released in February 2016. The second single, "How Not To", was released in September 2016. The third single, "Road Trippin'" released on July 17, 2017.

Background
In 2015, Dan + Shay experienced a career breakthrough when "Nothin' Like You", the third single from their chart-topping debut album, reached number one on the Billboard Country Airplay chart. That same year, they began work on their second album. The duo told country music blog The Boot that they have grown as artists and songwriters in the time since completing their first record but didn't stray too far from what fans have come to expect from them on Obsessed. They also noted that they had more time to work on this album, and as a result they are "really, really proud" of the music they created. Obsessed became available for pre-order on April 29, 2016.

The album's title is derived from the final track and was inspired by the duo's fans. Following the release of "From the Ground Up", Dan + Shay noticed fans using the hashtag "#obsessed" in relation to the song, and they ultimately decided the descriptor was appropriate for the album. "We're even more obsessed with making music for our fans than they are to hear it," explained vocalist Shay Mooney.

"All Nighter" was previously recorded by American country music trio Lady Antebellum for the deluxe edition of their sixth studio album, 747 (2014).

Promotion

Singles
The lead single for the album, "From the Ground Up", was released on February 5, 2016. It debuted at number 37 on the Country Airplay chart before its official radio release date (February 22, 2016) and has since peaked at number one; it has also reached a peak of number three on the Hot Country Songs chart and entered the top 50 on the Billboard Hot 100.

"How Not To" was released to radio on September 26, 2016 as the album's second official single.

"Road Trippin'" was selected by a fan vote as the record's third single. It was released to country radio on July 17, 2017.

Other songs
"Already Ready" was made available to digital retailers on April 29, 2016 alongside the pre-order launch. It entered the Hot Country Songs chart at number 44.

Commercial performance
Obsessed debuted on the Billboard 200 at number eight and the Top Country Albums chart at number two, selling 26,000 copies (33,000 equivalent album units) in its first week. The album has sold 95,700 copies in the US as of September 2017.

Track listing

Personnel
Dan + Shay
 Shay Mooney – lead vocals, background vocals
 Dan Smyers – electric guitar, background vocals

Additional musicians
 Roy Agee – trombone
 Jessica Blackwell – violin
 Charles Dixon – violin
 Scott Ducaj – trumpet
 Jesse Frasure – bass guitar, drums, keyboards, programming
 Jim Horn – alto saxophone, baritone saxophone
 Martin Johnson – bass guitar, acoustic guitar, electric guitar, keyboards, piano, background vocals
 Charlie Judge – string arrangements
 Elisabeth Lamb – viola
 Doug Moffet – tenor saxophone
 Gordon Mote – keyboards, piano, string arrangements
 Emily Nelson – cello
 Brandon Paddock – banjo, bass guitar, mandolin, programming, slide guitar, background vocals
 Russ Pahl – pedal steel guitar
 Danny Rader – acoustic guitar
 Jimmie Lee Sloas – bass guitar
 Bryan Sutton – acoustic guitar
 Derek Wells – electric guitar
 Nir Z – drums, percussion, programming

Charts

Weekly charts

Year-end charts

Certifications

References

2016 albums
Dan + Shay albums
Warner Records albums
Albums produced by Scott Hendricks
Albums produced by Jesse Frasure